Harry Charles Frederick Cornick (born 9 April 1995) is an English professional footballer who plays as a right winger or centre-forward for  club Bristol City.

He started his career at Christchurch before joining AFC Bournemouth in 2013. While at Bournemouth, he had numerous loans at clubs across the National League, League Two and League One before joining Luton for an undisclosed fee in 2017. He moved to Bristol City in January 2023.

Career

AFC Bournemouth
Cornick began his career with non-league Christchurch, scoring 17 goals in 33 Wessex League appearances, and joined AFC Bournemouth in September 2013 after a successful trial. Cornick went on loan to Conference Premier club Welling United in January 2014. He played five times for Welling scoring once in a 3–1 win away to Chester. He ended the season with a short loan spell at Aldershot Town.

Cornick made his professional debut for Bournemouth on 3 January 2015 in a 5–1 FA Cup victory over Rotherham United. In February 2015, Cornick went on loan to Havant & Waterlooville.

On 7 August 2015, Cornick joined League Two club Yeovil Town on a one-month loan. He made his debut the following day in a 3–2 defeat against Exeter City, scoring with his first touch after coming on as a half-time substitute.

On 26 July 2016, Cornick joined Leyton Orient on a six-month loan.

On 31 January 2017, Cornick joined Gillingham on loan until the end of the season.

Luton Town
On 8 August 2017, Cornick signed for League Two club Luton Town on a two-year contract for an undisclosed fee, with the option of a further year. His contract was extended by a further year at the end of the 2017–18 season after a promotion clause was triggered as a result of Luton's promotion to League One.

Cornick signed a new long-term contract with Luton in July 2019.

Bristol City
On 31 January 2023, Cornick signed for Championship club Bristol City on a three-and-a-half-year contract for an undisclosed fee.

Career statistics

Honours
Luton Town
EFL League Two runner-up: 2017–18
EFL League One: 2018–19

References

External links
Profile at the Luton Town F.C. website

1995 births
Living people
Sportspeople from Poole
Footballers from Dorset
English footballers
Association football wingers
Association football forwards
Christchurch F.C. players
AFC Bournemouth players
Welling United F.C. players
Aldershot Town F.C. players
Havant & Waterlooville F.C. players
Yeovil Town F.C. players
Leyton Orient F.C. players
Gillingham F.C. players
Luton Town F.C. players
National League (English football) players
English Football League players
People educated at Poole Grammar School
Wessex Football League players